, is a Japanese four-panel comic strip by bb Kuroda. It was serialized from 2008 to 2021 in the seinen manga magazine Manga Time Kirara Carat, published by Houbunsha. A prequel manga series, also by Kuroda, launched in Manga Time Kirara Carino from January 2012. An anime adaptation by Studio Gokumi aired in Japan between April 8, 2011, and June 24, 2011. An original video animation, A Channel +smile, was released on March 21, 2012.

Plot
Two adolescent girls named Tooru Ichii and Run Momoki have been best friends since childhood. After taking their entrance exams, Tooru successfully managed to get enrolled into the same high school that Run is attending. She decides to go tell her friend the big news, only to come at a bad time to find out Run and her new classmate Yuko Nishi have gotten themselves involved in an embarrassing situation; which begins to make things a bit awkward but funny on their first day of school, as Tooru begins fending off other people-(including boys) who might show their interests in Run while Yuko and their other friend, Nagi Tennoji, start dealing with Run's own penchant for drama. As Run, Nagi and Yuuko begin their sophomore year while Tooru begins her freshman year, their exciting high school life filled with drama, humor and adventure begins for the four friends during their everyday lives.

Characters

Main characters

A short first year student who often has overly long sleeves. Due to her short and skinny stature, she often has trouble finding clothes that fit her. She has been friends with Run since kindergarten, often getting lonely when separated from her and threatening anyone who tries to make a move on her. She disliked Yūko at first, since her first impression of her was seeing her in a compromising situation with Run, and since then constantly teases her at every opportunity. She has a pet cat named . Tooru is very fond of sweets, which her friends bribe her with.

A blonde second year student with a parakeet like hairstyle and Tōru's best friend. She is incredibly ditsy to the point that her friends often have to stop her from hurting herself in the process. She is very forgetful, even forgetting to wear her panties and bring her school stuff. Despite her qualities, she is very caring for Tooru and will try to help her when she's somewhat troubled.

She is a second year student and Run's classmate who sports pig-tails and glasses. She is often called by Run, Yūko, and Tōru by her nickname, Nagi. She is pretty intelligent and often makes quip remarks to her friends. She is sometimes conscious about her weight and hates extreme temperatures. She looks completely different when she lets her hair down and removes her glasses.

A long haired second year student and Run's classmate. She is something of a scaredy-cat who often finds herself at the mercy of Tōru's teasing, usually because she is envious of her tall and well endowed figure. She speaks with a prominent Kansai accent.

Other characters

A first year student and Tōru's classmate. She is a fan of Tōru and constantly tries to get friendly with her, much to Tōru's despair. She is very talkative and always takes the chance to get close to Tooru, but is always stopped by Miho.

A first year student and Yutaka's friend and classmate, who Yutaka affectionally calls Mipo-rin. She is also a fan of Tōru, though not quite to the extremes of Yutaka, and constantly tries to keep Yutaka from bothering Tōru too much. She works part-time as a maid in a cafe.

Tōru's homeroom teacher, who is obsessed with poetry. She is often quite motivated in the mornings, much to the dismay of the students, and doesn't get along too well with Satō.

Run, Yūko and Nagi's homeroom teacher, who has a rather laid back attitude. She is often seen teaching sports classes.

The school's health teacher, who is actually rather weak himself. He appears to have a crush on Run and has an infatuation with her forehead.

Yūko's younger sister who is quite dedicated to her sister.

Books and publications

Manga
The manga by bb Kuroda began serialization in Manga Time Kirara Carat from October 28, 2008. Eleven tankōbon volumes have been released as of November 25, 2020. An anthology comic featuring guest authors was released on June 27, 2011. A prequel manga series, A Channel ~days in junior high school~ began serialization in Manga Time Kirara Carino magazine from January 27, 2012.

Art book

Comics anthology

Official Guide Book

Anime

An anime adaptation produced by Studio Gokumi aired in Japan between April 8, 2011, and June 24, 2011. The series began release on Blu-ray Disc and DVD from May 25, 2011, with each volume containing two short +A Channel mini-episodes. Sentai Filmworks released the series on DVD in North America on February 28, 2012, with a Blu-ray release followed on January 27, 2015. An OVA, titled A Channel + smile, was released on March 21, 2012. Another OVA episode was included with a Blu-ray Disc Box released on September 27, 2017. Sentai Filmworks's license for A Channel expired on April 30, 2019.

Music
Opening Theme
"Morning Arch" by Marina Kawano (TV)
 by Marina Kawano (OVA)
Ending Theme
 by Aoi Yūki, Kaori Fukuhara, Minako Kotobuki and Yumi Uchiyama (TV)
 by Aoi Yūki, Kaori Fukuhara, Minako Kotobuki and Yumi Uchiyama (OVA)
Insert Songs
 by Kaori Fukuhara, Aoi Yūki, Minako Kotobuki and Yumi Uchiyama (ep. 1; ep. 12)
"Start" by Kaori Fukuhara, Aoi Yūki, Minako Kotobuki and Yumi Uchiyama (ep. 2)
 by Aoi Yūki (ep. 3)
"Summer Dream Syndrome" by Kaori Fukuhara (ep. 4)
"Mermaid Sisters" by Minako Kotobuki (ep. 5)
 by Yumi Uchiyama (ep. 6)
"Summer Breeze" by Minako Kotobuki (ep. 7)
 by Kaori Fukuhara (ep. 7)
 by Yumi Uchiyama (ep. 7)
 by Kaori Fukuhara and Aoi Yūki (ep. 7)
 by Daisuke Ono (ep. 7)
 by Kaori Fukuhara and Aoi Yūki (ep. 8)
 by Kaori Fukuhara, Aoi Yūki, Minako Kotobuki and Yumi Uchiyama (ep. 9)
"Happy Snow" by Kaori Fukuhara, Aoi Yūki, Minako Kotobuki and Yumi Uchiyama (ep. 10)
 by Aoi Yūki (ep. 11)
 by Minako Kotobuki and Yumi Uchiyama (ep. 12)
 by Aoi Yūki, Ai Matayoshi and Momoko Saitō (OVA ep. 1)
"Happy New Days" by Aoi Yūki, Kaori Fukuhara, Minako Kotobuki and Yumi Uchiyama (OVA ep. 2)

Appearances in other media
Characters from the series appear alongside other Manga Time Kirara characters in the 2017 mobile RPG, Kirara Fantasia.

References

External links

Animax original programming
Anime series based on manga
Comedy anime and manga
Houbunsha manga
Manga adapted into television series
Seinen manga
Sentai Filmworks
Studio Gokumi
Slice of life anime and manga
TBS Television (Japan) original programming
Yonkoma